John Patrick Roy Lamsam (born 15 May 1980) is a Hong Kong cricketer who has played 8 One Day Internationals and four ICC Trophy matches between 1997 and 2008. He is a specialist batsman who has batted between five and eight in the batting order for Hong Kong, scoring 15 ICC Trophy runs and 24 One Day International runs. In his debut match in the ICC Trophy, he was the seventh-choice bowler for Hong Kong, bowling the final over against Canada. However, he first bowled two wides (one of which was run for three), and then got injured. Because of the runs off wides counting against the bowler, but the wide not counting as a ball bowled, Lamsam ended with no balls bowled - and four runs conceded. As that was his only bowling in the ICC Trophy, this is still his career record.

Lamsam was selected to play for Hong Kong in the 2004 Asia Cup, scoring eight runs and taking zero wickets against Bangladesh.  He played a second ODI against India at the 2008 Asia Cup, scoring 16 before being run out by MS Dhoni.

References 

 

1980 births
Living people
Hong Kong cricketers
Hong Kong One Day International cricketers
Cricketers at the 2010 Asian Games
Cricketers at the 2014 Asian Games
Asian Games competitors for Hong Kong